Shipbuilding is a mini album by Tasmin Archer, released in 1994. Archer decided to follow up her successful 1992 debut Great Expectations with an EP of four covers of songs written by Elvis Costello, which was released in January 1994 in the singer's homeland of the UK. The title track peaked at No. 40. Costello admired the covers.

SBK Records, Archer's label in North America, decided to release the EP as a full album instead, and to fill the space they included four tracks from Archer's debut album in live form.

Critical reception

The Guardian wrote: "'Shipbuilding' and 'New Amsterdam', two of this overrated songwriter's most boring compositions, blossom under Archer's caressing voice and the piano softly tinkling in the background." The Boston Globe determined that "the melodic, piano-based 'When It Comes Right Down to It' is the standout."

AllMusic wrote that "none of the originals are bad; they're all fair to good, and the Costello covers are very powerful."

Track listing

"Shipbuilding" (Clive Langer, Elvis Costello) - 4:53
"Deep Dark Truthful Mirror" (Declan Patrick Aloysius MacManus) - 4:02
"All Grown Up" (Declan Patrick Aloysius MacManus) - 4:12
"New Amsterdam" (Elvis Costello) - 3:28
"Lords of the New Church" (John Beck, John Hughes, Archer) - (live) 5:13
"When It Comes Down to It" (John Beck, John Hughes, Archer) - (live) 4:40
"Steeltown" (John Beck, John Hughes, Archer) - (live) 4:49
"Sleeping Satellite" (John Beck, John Hughes, Archer) - (acoustic version) 3:26

Personnel
Tasmin Archer - vocals
John Hughes, Mark Hornby (tracks 5-7) - guitar
Marcus Cliffe - bass
B.J. Cole - pedal steel guitar (tracks 1-4)
Alan Clark - piano, Hammond organ (tracks 1-4)
John Beck - keyboards (tracks 5-8)
Charlie Morgan (tracks 1-4), Frank Tontoh (tracks 5-7), Mike Bedford (track 8) - drums

References

External links 
 Shipbuilding at Discogs

1994 albums
Tasmin Archer albums
SBK Records albums
Albums produced by Julian Mendelsohn